The Clinton Liberal Institute was a coeducational preparatory school established by the Universalist Church in the village of Clinton, in the Town of Kirkland, New York, in 1831, relocated to Fort Plain, New York in 1878, and remaining there until its buildings were destroyed in a fire in 1900.

History
Efforts by the Universalist Church to establish a non-denominational school in the State of New York began in 1831. The intent of these efforts was to create a school "not only for general purposes of science and literature, but with a particular view of furnishing with an education young men designed for the ministry of reconciliation", due to the perception that other Christian schools that dominated the state were "hostile to the doctrine" of Universalism. To this end, the Clinton Liberal Institute was established in Clinton, New York, and the first students were admitted in November 1831. On April 29, 1834, the New York State Legislature passed a bill entitled "A A to incorporate the Clinton liberal institute", formally allowing a group of eighteen trustees to create "The Clinton Liberal Institute" as a body "for the purpose of providing a literary seminary for the public instruction and education of youth."

The original building of the Institute was four stories tall (plus a basement), with a base 96 by 52 feet, built of gray stone. A separate wooden building for classes for women was two stories tall, and 40 by 25 feet. The school was placed under the visitation of the Regents of nearby Hamilton College in 1836.

In 1845, after much discussion within the Universalist Church about establishing a seminary in the state of New York, Reverend Thomas J. Sawyer—a leading proponent of such an establishment—took charge of the Clinton Liberal Institute. He set aside two hours per day to lecture on theology to any students who wanted to attend, at no cost to the students. He continued to offer this additional instruction until the fall of 1853, by which time efforts were underway to open a Universalist seminary elsewhere in New York. Sawyer prepared a total of 37 students to enter the ministry during this period.

In 1878, the Institute was relocated from Clinton to the facilities of the former Fort Plain Female Seminary and Collegiate Institute in Fort Plain, New York. In 1891, the Institute established a military academy (with both male and female cadets) as part of the school, and had an armory for the storage of artillery equipment. All of the Institute's buildings at the Fort Plain location were destroyed in a fire on March 25, 1900. The Institute's "remaining resources were then transferred to Canton, New York, and merged with the theological school of St. Lawrence University."

Associated individuals
Notable alumni include:
Adolphus C. Bartlett, industrialist
Clara Barton, founder of the American Red Cross
William Biddlecome, attorney and politician
Winchester Britton, attorney and politician
Matilda Joslyn Gage, suffragist
Francis H. Gates, politician
Jeremiah Keck, lawyer and politician
Philip Keck, lawyer, judge, and politician
Simon Lake, inventor of the modern submarine
Jervis McEntee, painter
Charles R. Skinner, U.S. Representative
Charles Stanford, merchant, newspaper publisher and politician
Leland Stanford, Governor of California, U.S. Senator, and founder of Stanford University
Farris B. Streeter, Solicitor of the United States Treasury
George E. Williams, newspaper publisher and politician

Other notable people connected to the Institute include Caroline Soule, an American novelist, poet, religious writer, who was employed for two terms (seven months), without pay, as the principal of the female department.

References

External links
New York Heritage Digital Collection of images from the Clinton Liberal Institute

Schools in Oneida County, New York
Defunct schools in New York (state)
1831 establishments in New York (state)
1900 disestablishments in New York (state)
Schools in Montgomery County, New York
Defunct military academies
Hamilton College (New York)
St. Lawrence University
Educational institutions established in 1831
Educational institutions disestablished in 1900